Myong Dong-chan (8 January 1948 – 1999) was a North Korean footballer. He competed in the men's tournament at the 1976 Summer Olympics. He coached North Korea national football team and national women's national football team. He died of liver cancer in 1999.

References

External links
 

1948 births
1999 deaths
North Korean footballers
North Korea international footballers
Olympic footballers of North Korea
Footballers at the 1976 Summer Olympics
Footballers at the 1974 Asian Games
Footballers at the 1978 Asian Games
Asian Games medalists in football
Asian Games gold medalists for North Korea
Medalists at the 1978 Asian Games
Place of birth missing
Association football midfielders
1999 FIFA Women's World Cup managers
North Korean football managers
North Korea national football team managers
North Korea women's national football team managers
Deaths from liver cancer